The 1888 Manitoba general election was held on July 11, 1888.

1888
1888 elections in Canada
1888 in Manitoba
July 1888 events